The 1971 European Baseball Championship was held in Italy and was won by the Netherlands for the second time in a row. Italy finished as runner-up.

Standings

References
(NL) European Championship Archive at honkbalsite

European Baseball Championship
European Baseball Championship
1971
1971 in Italian sport